The following is a timeline of the COVID-19 pandemic in Zhejiang for the year 2022.

January
On January 1, 2022, the Zhejiang Provincial Health Commission notified that from 00:00 to 24:00 on December 31, there was one new case of asymptomatic infection (imported from South Sudan).

On January 2, the Zhejiang Provincial Health and Health Commission reported that from 0:00 to 24:00 on January 1, there were 9 new confirmed cases, including 7 cases in Ningbo City and 2 cases imported from abroad (among them, asymptomatic infections imported from Germany were transferred to confirmed cases. 1 case, 1 case imported from South Korea), 9 new asymptomatic infections (including 3 cases imported from Australia, 2 cases imported from Tanzania, 2 cases imported from Uganda, 1 case imported from Guyana, and 1 case imported from Mexico).

On January 3, the Zhejiang Provincial Health and Health Commission reported that there were 10 new confirmed cases between 00:00 and 24:00 on January 2, including 9 cases in Ningbo City, 1 case imported from abroad (imported from South Sudan), and new asymptomatic infections. 4 cases (including 3 imported from Spain and 1 imported from Australia).

On January 4, the Zhejiang Provincial Health and Health Commission notified that from 0:00 to 24:00 on January 3, there were 9 new confirmed cases, including 8 cases in Ningbo City, 1 case imported from abroad (Sudan imported), and 2 new asymptomatic infections. Cases (including 1 case imported from Spain and 1 case imported from Australia).

On January 5, the Zhejiang Provincial Health and Health Commission reported that from 0:00 to 24:00 on January 4, there were 2 new confirmed cases (Ningbo City, both of which were detected at the centralized isolation point), and 7 new asymptomatic infections (including 3 cases were imported from Spain, 1 case was imported from Australia, 1 case was imported from Côte d'Ivoire, 1 case was imported from Tanzania, and 1 case was imported from Trinidad and Tobago).

On January 31, the Zhejiang Provincial Health Commission notified that from 0:00 to 24:00 on January 30, there were 24 new confirmed cases (Hangzhou City, all found in centralized isolation points), and 4 new asymptomatic infections (imported from Iraq. )

February
On February 1, the Zhejiang Provincial Health and Health Commission reported that from 0:00 to 24:00 on January 31, 13 new confirmed cases (Hangzhou City, all found in centralized isolation points) and 2 new asymptomatic infections (imported from Iraq ).

March
On March 1, the Zhejiang Provincial Health Commission notified that from 0:00 to 24:00 on February 28, there was one new case of asymptomatic infection (imported from Serbia), and no new confirmed cases.

April
On April 1, the Zhejiang Provincial Health Commission notified that from 00:00 to 24:00 on March 31, 11 new confirmed cases were reported in 11 cities. Among them, 5 were imported cases (all were asymptomatic infections imported from abroad before confirmed); 10 local cases (3 cases in Hangzhou City, 4 cases in Ningbo City, 1 case in Jiaxing City, and 2 cases in Huzhou City), including 5 cases From an asymptomatic infection to a confirmed case (3 cases in Hangzhou, 1 case in Ningbo, and 1 case in Jiaxing). 11 cities reported 10 new cases of asymptomatic infection. Among them, 2 cases were imported from abroad (1 case imported from Japan, 1 case imported from Chad); 8 local cases (3 cases in Hangzhou City, 3 cases in Jiaxing City, 1 case in Huzhou City, and 1 case in Quzhou City).

May
On May 1, the Zhejiang Provincial Health Commission reported that from 04:00 on April 30, 11 cities reported no new confirmed cases. 11 cities reported 22 new cases of asymptomatic infections. Among them, 4 cases were imported from overseas (2 cases were imported from Australia, 1 case was imported from Hong Kong, China, and 1 case was imported from Portugal), and 18 local cases (3 cases were from Hangzhou City, 2 cases from Ningbo City, 2 cases from Wenzhou City, 1 case from Jiaxing City, and 1 case from Quzhou City). 5 cases in Taizhou City, 4 cases in Lishui City).

June
On June 1, the Zhejiang Provincial Health and Health Commission reported that from 0:00 to 24:00 on May 31, 11 cities reported no new local positive infections. Eleven cities reported no new confirmed cases. There were 3 newly cured and discharged cases on the same day, and 20 confirmed cases. Eleven cities reported 3 new cases of asymptomatic infection. Among them, 3 cases were imported from abroad (1 case imported from Colombia, 1 case imported from Thailand, and 1 case imported from Panama); there were no local asymptomatic infections. 39 cases of asymptomatic infection were released from medical observation on the same day, and 314 cases of asymptomatic infection were still under medical observation.

July
On July 1, the Zhejiang Provincial Health and Health Commission reported that from 00:00 to 24:00 on June 30, 11 cities reported 2 new cases of local positive infections, of which 1 was detected at the centralized isolation point and 1 was screened in the community. Control measures have been implemented. 11 cities reported 2 new confirmed cases. Among them, 2 cases were imported from abroad (both were converted from asymptomatic infections imported from abroad to confirmed cases); there were no local cases. There were no new cured and discharged cases on that day, and there were 10 confirmed cases. 11 cities reported 9 new cases of asymptomatic infection. Among them, 7 cases were imported from abroad (2 cases were imported from the United Kingdom, 1 case was imported from the United States, 1 case was imported from Peru, 1 case was imported from Romania, 1 case was imported from Brunei, and 1 case was imported from Japan); example). 63 cases of asymptomatic infection were released from medical observation on the same day, and 66 cases of asymptomatic infection were still under medical observation.

August
On August 1, the Zhejiang Provincial Health Commission notified that from 00:00 to 24:00 on July 31, 11 cities reported no new local positive infections. Eleven cities reported no new confirmed cases. There were 2 newly cured and discharged cases on the same day, and 18 confirmed cases. 11 cities reported 6 new cases of asymptomatic infection. Among them, 6 cases were imported from abroad (2 cases were imported from Liberia, 1 case was imported from Brazil, 1 case was imported from South Korea, 1 case was imported from the United States, and 1 case was imported from Pakistan); there were no local asymptomatic infections. 3 cases of asymptomatic infection were released from medical observation on the same day, and 41 cases of asymptomatic infection were still under medical observation.

September
On September 1, the Zhejiang Provincial Health and Health Commission notified that from 0:00 to 24:00 on August 31, 11 cities reported a new local positive case, which was detected at a centralized isolation point, and control measures have been implemented. Eleven cities reported no new confirmed cases. There were 7 newly cured and discharged cases that day, and 60 confirmed cases. 11 cities reported 10 new cases of asymptomatic infection. Among them, 9 cases were imported from abroad (2 cases were imported from South Korea, 2 cases were imported from Portugal, 2 cases were imported from Vietnam, 1 case was imported from the United States, 1 case was imported from Spain, and 1 case was imported from Singapore); 1 case was imported from China (Taizhou City). 30 cases of asymptomatic infection were released from medical observation on the same day, and 145 cases of asymptomatic infection were still under medical observation.

October
On October 1, the Zhejiang Provincial Health and Health Commission notified that from 00:00 to 24:00 on September 30, 11 cities reported 6 new local positive cases, all of which were detected at centralized isolation points, and control measures had been implemented. 11 cities reported 4 new confirmed cases. Among them, 1 imported case (converted from asymptomatic infection imported from abroad to confirmed case); 3 local cases (1 in Ningbo, 1 in Wenzhou, and 1 in Taizhou), of which 2 were previously asymptomatic. The infected person was converted to a confirmed case (1 case in Wenzhou City and 1 case in Taizhou City), and 1 case was newly detected and confirmed on the same day. There were 3 newly cured and discharged cases on the same day, and there are 26 confirmed cases. 11 cities reported 20 new cases of asymptomatic infections. Among them, 15 cases were imported from abroad (3 cases in the United States, 3 cases in Thailand, 2 cases in Germany, 1 case in the Russian Federation, 1 case in Japan, 1 case in Singapore, 1 case in Israel, 1 case in Indonesia, 1 case in the United Kingdom, and 1 case in Vietnam); Cases (1 case in Hangzhou City, 1 case in Jiaxing City, 3 cases in Jinhua City). 25 cases of asymptomatic infection were released from medical observation on the same day, and 112 cases of asymptomatic infection were still under medical observation.

November
On November 1, the Zhejiang Provincial Health Commission notified that from 0:00 to 24:00 on October 31, 11 cities reported no new local positive infections. Eleven cities reported no new confirmed cases. There were 5 newly cured and discharged cases on the same day, and there are 93 confirmed cases. Eleven cities reported 11 new cases of asymptomatic infections. Among them, 11 cases were imported from abroad (2 cases were imported from Japan, 2 cases were imported from Singapore, 2 cases were imported from Indonesia, 2 cases were imported from Hong Kong, China, 1 case was imported from Thailand, 1 case was imported from France, and 1 case was imported from Italy); there were no local asymptomatic infections. 9 cases of asymptomatic infections were released from medical observation on the same day, and 277 cases of asymptomatic infections are still under medical observation.

December
On December 1, the Zhejiang Provincial Health and Health Commission reported that from 00:00 to 24:00 on November 30, 11 cities reported 253 new local positive cases, of which 146 were detected in centralized isolation points, 23 were detected in home isolation, 60 cases were intercepted at the entrance, 22 cases were screened in the community, 1 case was screened by the unit, and 1 case was actively visited. Control measures have been implemented. 11 cities reported 93 new confirmed cases. Among them, there were no imported cases; 93 local cases (19 in Hangzhou, 15 in Ningbo, 12 in Wenzhou, 6 in Huzhou, 16 in Shaoxing, 5 in Quzhou, 1 in Zhoushan, and 19 in Taizhou) ), of which 41 cases were previously asymptomatic infections converted to confirmed cases (15 cases in Hangzhou City, 2 cases in Ningbo City, 1 case in Huzhou City, 10 cases in Shaoxing City, 2 cases in Quzhou City, and 11 cases in Taizhou City). 52 cases were confirmed. There were 14 newly cured and discharged cases on the same day, and there are 645 confirmed cases. Eleven cities reported 220 new cases of asymptomatic infections. Among them, 19 cases were imported from abroad (5 cases were imported from Germany, 3 cases were imported from Vietnam, 3 cases were imported from Italy, 2 cases were imported from Singapore, 1 case was imported from Thailand, 1 case was imported from Canada, 1 case was imported from Hong Kong, China, 1 case was imported from Spain, and 1 case was imported from Japan. 201 local cases (78 in Hangzhou, 15 in Ningbo, 8 in Wenzhou, 4 in Huzhou, 24 in Jiaxing, 11 in Shaoxing, 28 in Jinhua, 5 in Quzhou) 1 case in Zhoushan City, 24 cases in Taizhou City, and 3 cases in Lishui City). 38 cases of asymptomatic infection were released from medical observation on the same day, and 1661 cases of asymptomatic infection were still under medical observation.

References

2022 in Zhejiang
COVID-19 pandemic in China by city
Zhejiang

zh:2019冠状病毒病浙江省疫情时间线 (2022年)